Since 2008, Feeric Fashion Week has developed as an international fashion hub for designers coming from more than 20 countries and 4 continents. It is based in the city of Sibiu, Transylvania, Romania, and it is covered by fashion press like Vogue Italy, Schön Magazine and Euronews. Vogue Italy described it as the most important fashion event of Romania.
Vogue Italy also says about the creativity of transforming the most peculiar places in catwalk-ready settings. Schön Magazine is calling Feeric Fashion Week as the greatest fashion week in Eastern Europe.

The president of Feeric Fashion Week is Mitichi and it is supported by The City Hall of Sibiu.

Origin 

The first Feeric Fashion Week was created in Sibiu, in 2008 by Mitichi, art director and fashion photographer. Feeric is the Romanian word for "magic" and the name came from the beauty of the Small Square, a very popular square among the tourists and such a fancy place for locals.

The first event organized, was called "Feeric Fashion Show", because it was only one night outdoor event in the Small Square of Sibiu and was created to attract attention on local talents in fashion. The project was a success for locals and developed itself into a bigger one. The second edition was bigger but still for one night and the same was the third one. But the new thing Feeeric brought was the runway built as a bridge over the road to Piata Mica Starting the 4th edition the event was called Feeric Fashion Days because of its 3 days of events: fashion shows, exhibitions, conferences, workshops and the different innovative places it started to outline itself as a very creative fashion project. One year later, in 2012 Feeric became an international one and it was a 6 days event.

Consolidation as "Feeric Fashion Week" 

The structure kept like this until 2016 when the event finally became Feeric Fashion Week with its 9 days of fashion shows at places like airport, railway depot, factories, castles, palaces, streets, rivers, bridges etc. The actress Catrinel Marlon was the ambassador of the 9th edition.

Other notable events

Feeric Gala 

The year the project started it only included 3 shows in the Small Square of Sibiu. Year by year this event become the Feeric Gala and is the closing event of the whole fashion week.

Individual Show 

During the 4th edition, in July 2011 the concept of Individual Show started, and it became in time the most interesting part of the fashion week.
"One of the strengths of this fashion event it’s definitely its locations: under the direction of founder Mitichi Preda, a little army of photographers, video makers, builders and assistants transformed, each time, the most random places in catwalk-ready settings. In this edition only, we’ve seen models walking down in the middle of the wood, through rural churches’ naves, in front of Hobbit Houses or on a rotating platform in the train depot (but last year they were also cat walking in the airport of Sibiu: runway, literally)".

Feeric Venue Show 
Nevertheless the shows in Feeric Venue are very spectacular and beautiful because of the sets and the audience that is growing year by year. The Redal Expo is offering 3000 square meters and that is the headquarter of Feeric Fashion Week.

Atipic Beauty 
Feeric Fashion Week hosts independent project and support them to develop. One of the projects is Atipic Beauty, a special show with wheelchairs models "The event takes on fashion somewhat differently than most other fashion weeks, for instance, FFW Day One saw wheelchair bound models showcasing designs in association with Atipic Beauty, an organization for research into spinal cord injuries. Inclusive fashion that ebbs away at the superficial demeanour of the industry can’t be a bad thing. On that note, let’s touch on a couple of other highlights from this year’s FFW."

Attendance

Admission to shows at Feeric Fashion Week is free for everyone but standing only. Although in the form of accreditation, journalists and bloggers will have their seats and photographer their place in their special area. People can get front row with specific events by invitation only.

Partners
The main partner of the fashion week is The City Hall of Sibiu and international partners are Istituto Europeo di Design Fashion Channel and Mad Mood Milano

Gallery

See also
Fashion week
 List of fashion events

References

External links
Feeric Fashion Week Official Site
Feeric Fashion Week official Facebook page

Fashion events in Romania
Sibiu
Annual events in Romania
2008 establishments in Romania
Recurring events established in 2008
Summer events in Romania
Fashion weeks